Red fascism is a term equating Stalinism, Maoism, and other variants of Marxism–Leninism with fascism. Accusations that the leaders of the Soviet Union during the Stalin era acted as "red fascists" were commonly stated by anarchists, left communists, social democrats and other democratic socialists as well as liberals and among right-wing circles.

Use of the term by the anti-Stalinist left, mid-20th century 
Use of the term "red fascist" was first recorded in the early 1920s, in the aftermath of both the Russian Revolution and the March on Rome, for instance by Italian anarchist Luigi Fabbri who wrote in 1922 that "“Red fascists” is the name that has recently been given to those Bolshevik communists who are most inclined to espouse fascism’s methods for use against their adversaries." 

In the following years, a number of socialists began to hold the view that the Soviet government was becoming a red fascist state. Bruno Rizzi, an Italian Marxist and a founder of the Communist Party of Italy who became an anti-Stalinist, claimed in 1938 that "Stalinism [took on] a regressive course, generating a species of red fascism identical in its superstructural and choreographic features [with its Fascist model]".

While primarily focused on critiquing Nazism, Wilhelm Reich considered Stalin's Soviet Union to have developed into red fascism.

The term is often attributed to Franz Borkenau, a key proponent of the theory of totalitarianism (which posits that there are certain essential similarities between fascism and Stalinism). Borkenau used the term in 1939. Otto Rühle wrote that "the struggle against fascism must begin with the struggle against bolshevism", adding that he believed  the Soviets had influence on fascist states by serving as a model. In 1939, Rühle further professed:Russia was the example for fascism. [...] Whether party 'communists' like it or not, the fact remains that the state order and rule in Russia are indistinguishable from those in Italy and Germany. Essentially they are alike. One may speak of a red, black, or brown 'soviet state', as well as of red, black or brown fascism.Memos, C. (2012) "Anarchism and Council Communism on the Russian Revolution ." Anarchist Studies, 20(2). 

Kurt Schumacher, who was imprisoned in Nazi concentration camps, but survived WWII to become the first post-war SPD opposition leader in West Germany, described pro-Soviet communists as "red-painted fascists" or "red-lacquered Nazis". 

Similarly, the exiled Russian anarchist Volin, who saw the Soviet state as totalitarian and as an "example of integral State capitalism", used the term "red fascism" to describe it. 

In the US, Norman Thomas (who ran for president numerous times under the Socialist Party of America banner), accused the Soviet Union in the 1940s of decaying into Red fascism by writing: "Such is the logic of totalitarianism", that "communism, whatever it was originally, is today Red fascism". In the same period, the term was used by the New York intellectuals, who were left-wing but sided against the Soviet Union in the developing Cold War.

Use of the term in the political mainstream in the Cold War
The term "red fascism" was also used in America during and leading up to the Cold War as an anti-communist slogan. In a September 18, 1939 editorial, The New York Times reacted to the signing of the Molotov–Ribbentrop Pact by declaring that "Hitlerism is brown communism, Stalinism is red fascism". The editorial further opined:
The world will now understand that the only real 'ideological' issue is one between democracy, liberty and peace on the one hand and despotism, terror and war on the other. After the war, in 1946, FBI director J. Edgar Hoover gave a speech in which he said: Hitler, Tojo, and Mussolini brands of Fascism were met and defeated on the battle fıeld. All those who stand for the American way of life must arise and defeat Red Fascism in America by focusing upon it the spotlight of public opinion and by building up barriers of common decency through which it cannot penetrate. The speech was reprinted in December 1946 in the Washington News Digest, and Hoover also entitled an article “Red Fascism in the United States Today” in American Magazine in February 1947.

Jack Tenney, an anti-communist politician who chaired the California Senate Factfinding Subcommittee on Un-American Activities published a report entitled Red Fascism in 1947, which drew on the popular anti-fascism of the war years to portray the Soviet Union and domestic Communism as similar to the Nazis. The same year the term was used by politicians Everett Dirksen and Henderson Lovelace Lanham.

More recent uses
French philosopher and journalist Bernard-Henri Lévy has used the term in arguing that some European intellectuals have been infatuated with anti-Enlightenment theories and embraced a new absolutist ideology, one that is anti-liberal, anti-American, anti-imperialist, antisemitic and pro-Islamofascist.

Chinazi is a recent anti-Chinese sentiment which compares China to Nazi Germany, combining the words "China" and "Nazi". First published by Chinese dissident Yu Jie, it became frequently used during Hong Kong protests against the Chinese government, contending that the People's Republic of China is turning itself into fascist state although the then-ruling Kuomintang and the Blue Shirts Society during the Republican era and martial law period on Taiwan that turned the country into a fascist state during these periods.

See also 
 Comparison of Nazism and Stalinism
 Definitions of fascism
 Fascist (insult)
 Horseshoe theory
 National Bolshevism
 Revolutionary Feudal-Totalitarianism
 Social fascism
 Tankie
  - self-described left-wing French newspaper that went on to support the Nazi occupation of France

References

Bibliography 
 
 

Communist terrorism
Fascism
National Bolshevism
Stalinism
Anti-Stalinist left